The Marxist Workers League was the name of two splinter groups from the Revolutionary Workers League in the 1930s.

The first group split in early 1936 and "after a sensational existence of both its members for 19 days" rejoined the Trotskyists.

The second group formed in early 1938, containing elements from the RWL, Albert Weisbord's Communist League of Struggle, and the Trotskyist YPSL. Its central criticism of the RWL was of its analysis of the Spanish Civil War, which it believed was an imperialist war. Its principal leader was Karl Mienov. Mienov advocated for a revolutionary defeatist position in Spain, rather than the critical support of the Republican government advocated by the RWL, declaring "to be wrong on the Spanish war means to open the door wide open to social-patriotism in the coming imperialist world war... We are proud that we split from such a centrist group."

The MWL published a "theoretical organ" out of New York called Spark, and then Power, from February 1938 to 1940. According to Walter Goldberg, Spark lasted from Vol. I #1 Feb. 1938 to Vol. II #3 May 1939. About that time the group merged with another small sect, the Revolutionary Marxist League, led by Meldon Joerger, to create a group called the Workers Party. This new sect appears to have died out quickly, and should not be confused with the Shachtmanite Workers Party that was formed around the same time.

References

External links 
Marxist Workers League publications on Archive.org
Cover of the first issue of the second MWL serial, Power
On the question of the workers state polemic against the MWL by the Leninist League.

Defunct communist parties in the United States
Political parties established in 1938